Eslam Mohareb (born January 1, 1992) is an Egyptian professional footballer who plays as a right-wing for Egyptian Premier League club Tala'ea El Gaish.

References

1992 births
Living people
Egyptian footballers
Egypt international footballers
Al Ahly SC players
El Gouna FC players
Smouha SC players
Tala'ea El Gaish SC players
Egyptian Premier League players
Footballers from Cairo
Association football midfielders